The Shankar Mahadevan Academy is a music academy founded by composer and singer Shankar Mahadevan along with Sridhar Ranganathan Founder and CEO of Cloodon- Personalized Learning Platform. Offices of the institution are located at Palo Alto, California in the United States and Bangalore in India.

News
 ^http://www.newindianexpress.com/cities/bangalore/Gurukul-tradition-goes-online/2013/08/17/article1738604.ece
 ^https://bangaloremirror.indiatimes.com/entertainment/lounge/Many-notes-one-tune/articleshow/27093821.cms
 ^http://www.business-standard.com/article/companies/companies-promote-musical-talent-at-workplace-113090700599_1.html
 ^https://web.archive.org/web/20131217071847/http://www.indiawest.com/news/12530-microsoft-and-shankar-mahadevan-launch-music-app.html

References

External links
Official Website

Music schools in India
Music schools in Bangalore
Shankar–Ehsaan–Loy